William Paul (5 August 1868 – 3 August 1932) was a Scottish footballer who played as a full back.

Career
Born in Paisley, Paul played club football for Dykebar and Paisley Academicals, and made one appearance for Scotland in 1891; he was the only serving Dykebar player to have been selected for international duty. He later worked in schools football and became a prominent figure in the laundry industry.

References

1868 births
1932 deaths
Scottish footballers
Scotland international footballers
Association football fullbacks
Footballers from Paisley, Renfrewshire